Harold Robinson Scott (October 14, 1894 – October 9, 1961) was a Canadian politician who was a Member of Provincial Parliament in Legislative Assembly of Ontario from 1943 to 1959. He represented the riding of Peterborough for the Ontario Progressive Conservative Party. He was born in Shawbridge, Quebec and was a lumberman. He died in 1961.

References

1894 births
1961 deaths
Progressive Conservative Party of Ontario MPPs